Yoshitarō, Yoshitaro or Yoshitarou is a masculine Japanese given name.

Possible writings
Yoshitarō can be written using different combinations of kanji characters. Here are some examples: 

The characters used for "taro" (太郎) literally means "thick (big) son" and usually used as a suffix to a masculine name, especially for the first son. The "yoshi" part of the name can use a variety of characters, each of which will change the meaning of the name ("吉" for good luck, "義" for justice, "良" and so on).

義太郎, "justice, big son"
吉太郎, "good luck, big son"
良太郎, "good, big son"
芳太郎, "fragrant/virtuous, big son"

Other combinations...

義太朗, "justice, thick, bright"
義多朗, "justice, many, bright"
義汰朗, "justice, excessive, bright"
良太朗, "good, thick, bright"
良多朗, "good, many, bright"

The name can also be written in hiragana よしたろう or katakana ヨシタロウ.

Notable people with the name

, Japanese boxer
, Japanese yakuza boss
, Japanese film director, producer and screenwriter

Japanese masculine given names